All Around the Circle was a Canadian variety television series which featured the music of Newfoundland and Labrador, performed in St. John's.

External links
 Queen's University Directory of CBC Television Series (All Around the Circle archived listing link via archive.org)
 All Around the Circle at TVArchive.ca

CBC Television original programming
1969 Canadian television series debuts
1979 Canadian television series endings
1960s Canadian variety television series
Canadian folk music
Television shows filmed in St. John's, Newfoundland and Labrador
1970s Canadian variety television series